DJ Khushi is a disc jockey in India and has been awarded the Most Popular Bollywood DJ award. Because of his frequent appearances, Khushi is also known as the official DJ of Shahrukh Khan. He was the opening DJ during Tiesto's Delhi Gig. In 2016, he headlined the Sunburn Music Festival with Hardwell, the world's No.1 DJ. In Dec'16, Ellie Goulding and Nervo performed alongside DJ Khushi. Khushi has also performed with LMFAO, Edward Maya and Akcent.

He has collaborated with big banner projects and created official remixes for Bollywood films.
In 2020, he made his debut as a composer and singer in Bollywood with the song "Burjkhalifa" from Laxmii starring Akshay Kumar and Kiara Advani. The song was penned by Gagan Ahuja, composed by himself along with Shashi and sung by Shashi Suman along with Nikhita Gandhi.

Projects 
BOLLYWOOD
 Chammak Challo - Sung by Akon, Tulsi Kumar (Ra.One)
 Ae Dil Hai Mushkil Title Track - Sung by Arijit Singh
 Soch Na Sake - Sung by Arijit Singh (Airlift)
 Chittiyaan Kalaiyaan - Sung by Kanika Kapoor, Meet Bros (Roy)
 Dayre - Sung by Arijit Singh (Dilwale)
 Boss Title Track - Sung by Ajjan of Meet Bros, Yo Yo Honey Singh
 Nachaange Saari Raat - Sung by Neeraj Shridhar, Tulsi Kumar (Junooniyat)
 Chahun Main Ya Na - Sung by Arijit Singh, Palak Muchhal (Aashiqui 2)
 Anarkali Disco Chali - Sung by Mamta Sharma, Sukhwinder Singh (Housefull 2)
 Right Now Now - Sung by Wajid Khan, Sunidhi Chauhan, Suzanne D'Mello (Housefull 2)
 Hasi (Female Version) - Sung by Shreya Ghoshal (Hamari Adhuri Kahani)
 DJ Waley Babu - Sung by Badshah
 Jeena Jeena - Sung by Atif Aslam (Badlapur)
 Desi Look - Sung by Kanika Kapoor (Ek Paheli Leela)
 Meherbani - Sung by Jubin Nautiyal (The Shaukeens)
 Pyaar Mein Dil Pe Maar De Goli - Sung by Bappi Lahiri, Kishore Kumar, Asha Bhosle  (Tamanchey)
 Chikni Chameli - Sung by Shreya Ghoshal (Agneepath)
 Ek Tha Deewana - Sung by Vijay Prakash, Suzanne D'Mello, Blaaze (Vinnaithaandi Varuvaayaa)
 Jhak Maar Ke - Sung by Neeraj Shridhar, Harshdeep Kaur (Desi Boyz)
 Tum Mile Title Track - Sung by Neeraj Shridhar
 Mrs. Khanna - Sung by Shaan, Sunidhi Chauhan, Bappi Lahiri, Suzanne D'Mello, Neuman Pinto (Main Aurr Mrs Khanna) 
 Kaminey Title Track - Sung by Vishal Bhardwaj
 De Dana Dan Title Track - Sung by Ad Boys
 Burjkhalifa - Sung by DJ Khushi, Shashi Suman, Nikhita Gandhi (Laxmii)
INTERNATIONAL
 Get Down - Pacha Recordings
 Home - Stoney Boy Music (Armada Music)
 Sublime - Lohit
 Unleashed - Outta Limits
 Let's Party All Night - Housesession Records

References 

Year of birth missing (living people)
Living people
Indian DJs